Harry Reid (born 22 June 1992) is an English actor. He is known for his role as Ben Mitchell in the BBC soap opera EastEnders, from 2014 until 2018.

Career 
Reid trained in acting, physical theatre and musical theatre at Miskin Theatre in Dartford from 2008, until 2010. He performed in several stage shows including Wind in the Willows, The Resistible Rise of Arturo Ui and Agamemnon. Reid then underwent a three year BA (Hons) Acting degree at The Arts University Bournemouth between 2010 and 2013.

In early 2014, Reid appeared as Tom in a short film, The Last Waltz, for Canterbury Christ Church. He later appeared as Ricky in a feature film, K-Shop, for White Lantern Films.

On 18 July 2014, it was announced that Reid had been cast in the role of Ben Mitchell in the BBC soap opera EastEnders. He became the fifth actor to portray the character, replacing Joshua Pascoe. Reid expressed his excitement at joining the cast and portraying Ben, stating that Ben has such a rich backstory and is "so renowned". He added that he looked forward to working with actor Steve McFadden, who portrays Ben's father Phil Mitchell. EastEnders is Reid's first major role since leaving university. On 2 October 2017, it was announced that Reid would be leaving the soap after producers decided to write out the character. He confirmed that he would finish filming in December 2017. Reid made his final appearance on 12 January 2018.

Reid told Daniel Kilkelly of entertainment website Digital Spy that he had received offers after leaving EastEnders and that he would be attending auditions. On 23 February 2018, Reid announced that he would join the stage production of Witness for the Prosecution, portraying the character Leonard Vole. On the role, Reid commented, "It's a very interesting part to play, and the story keeps you guessing until the end." In October 2019, he appeared in the fifth series of the E4 reality series Celebrity Coach Trip.

Filmography

Stage credits

Awards and nominations

References

External links

1992 births
Living people
English male soap opera actors
Alumni of Arts University Bournemouth
People from Gravesend, Kent